Sarwark is a surname. Notable people with the surname include:

John F Sarwark, American pediatrician
Nicholas Sarwark (born 1979), American politician